Live, Love and Believe is a 1911 silent film short produced by the Essanay Studios and released through the General Film Company. The film starred Francis X. Bushman and Dorothy Phillips. It was released in split-reel form with Saved from the Torrents.

Cast
Francis X. Bushman as Harry Ainsworth
Dorothy Phillips as Dorothy Chalmers

See also
Francis X. Bushman filmography

References

External links
 Live, Love and Believe at IMDb.com

1911 films
1911 short films
American silent short films
Essanay Studios films
American black-and-white films
1910s American films